Lu Han (鹿晗, born 1990) is a Chinese singer and actor.

Lu Han may also refer to:

 Lu Han (Tang dynasty) (盧翰, 8th century), Tang dynasty chancellor
 Lu Han (general) (盧漢, 1895–1974), Kuomintang general

See also
 Liu Han
 Luhan (disambiguation)